Haudankylmyyden Mailla (Finnish for "in the lands of the coldness of graves") is the second full-length studio album by the black metal band Horna. It was released on Solistitium Records in 1999 and was limited to 1,500 copies. It was then re-released by Omvina Records in 2005, and again on Blut & Eisen Productions in 2007. Both re-released versions have some type of alteration from the original version.

Track listing

Personnel
Band members
 Lauri Penttilä (Nazgul) – vocals
 Jyri Vahvanen (Moredhel) – guitar
 Shatraug – guitar
 Skratt – bass
 Gorthaur – drums

Technical staff
 Anssi Kippo – mixer, recorder, producer
 Jere Juutilainen (Fuuturi KY, LPR) – artwork design
 Mattias Persson – other artwork
 Kris Verwimp – portraits
 Christophe Szpajdel - logo

References

External links
Metal Archives  Haudankylmyyden Mailla
Discogs - Haudankylmyyden Mailla (1999)
Discogs - Haudankylmyyden Mailla (2005)
Discogs - Haudankylmyyden Mailla (2007)
Official Horna Site - Discography

Horna albums
1999 albums